Ericsburg is an unincorporated community in Koochiching County, Minnesota, United States.

The community is located southeast of International Falls at the junction of U.S. Highway 53 and County Road 98.

Ericsburg is located within Rainy Lake Unorganized Territory.

Nearby places include International Falls, Ray, and Kabetogama. Ericsburg is located nine miles southeast of International Falls and 15 miles northwest of Kabetogama. The Rat Root River flows through the community.

ZIP codes 56669 (Ray / Kabetogama) and 56649 (International Falls) meet near Ericsburg.

History
Ericsburg was founded by a real estate agent named Erik Franson, for whom the community is named. A post office called Ericsburg was established in 1907, and remained in operation until 1966.

References

 Rand McNally Road Atlas – 2007 edition – Minnesota entry
 Official State of Minnesota Highway Map – 2011/2012 edition
 Mn/DOT map of Koochiching County – Sheet 4 – 2011 edition

Unincorporated communities in Minnesota
Unincorporated communities in Koochiching County, Minnesota